"Just a Lil Bit" is the third single from 50 Cent's second album, The Massacre. The song was produced by Scott Storch. Released on May 17, 2005, the single reached number three in the United States, becoming 50 Cent's sixth solo top-ten single, and ninth overall. It also reached number ten in the United Kingdom. The B-side is a live recording of "Disco Inferno" for AOL Sessions.

Background
"Just a Lil Bit" debuted at number 69 on the Billboard Hot 100 and peaked at number three on the chart. The song was eventually certified Platinum by the RIAA.
The official remix features rapper White Dawg. T-Pain used the instrumental to do a freestyle called "A Little Hit". Game also used the instrumental on his song "300 Bars & Runnin'", in which he disses 50 Cent and other members of G-Unit. He also redid "Just a Lil Bit" as a diss to 50 Cent.

Music video
The music video is set in Cancún, Mexico, and follows a thin plot where 50 Cent, as "El Jefe" ("The Boss"), employs three beautiful women to set up his enemies, played by Emilio Rivera, Hassan Johnson and Jesús Ochoa. 50 Cent leaves each enemy $50. The video also contains cameos by some G-Unit artists.

CD cover
The artwork for the CD cover shows 50 Cent's modern adaptation of the rap squat that includes the prayer pose.

Track listing
 UK CD single 1
 "Just a Lil Bit" - 3:59
 "Disco Inferno" (Live AOL Session) - 3:11

 UK CD single 2
 "Just a Lil Bit" - 3:59
 "Just a Lil Bit" (Instrumental) - 3:59
 "Just a Lil Bit" (Music Video) - 3:59
 "Disco Inferno" (Live AOL Session - Music Video) - 3:11

Charts

Weekly charts

Year-end charts

Certifications

References

External links
 50 Cent's official website
 "Just a Lil Bit" lyrics
 

2005 songs
2005 singles
50 Cent songs
Songs written by 50 Cent
Song recordings produced by Scott Storch
Songs written by Scott Storch
Music videos directed by Benny Boom
Shady Records singles
Aftermath Entertainment singles
Interscope Records singles